The Yellow Fever Commission was a research team of the United States Army which researched treatment for yellow fever.

The commission was originally formed as the Reed Commission by Army Surgeon General  George Sternberg in 1900. The medical research board was forged as a four member board consisting of Walter Reed, James Carroll, Jesse W. Lazear, and Aristides Agramonte. The U.S. Army research detachment was commissioned for public health surveillance regarding a tropical disease susceptible by the predatorial Aedes aegypti or an infectious mosquito in Cuba. The mosquito-borne disease or yellow fever pathogen was found to have inflicted an elevated casualty count during the Spanish–American War.

The research process itself became a focus of study for later generations.

A United States nurse named Clara Maass and two Spanish immigrants were among those who died as a result of their research participation.

Researchers mark the research of the Yellow Fever Commission as the origin of the model of modern consent in medical research.

In popular culture

The 1934 Yellow Jack theatrical production told the story of Walter Reed in the Yellow Fever Commission. The theatre production was cast with Sam Levene, James Stewart, Eddie Acuff, and Myron McCormick.

The Broadway play was the basis of Yellow Jack, a 1938 movie presenting the same narrative.

See also
A Short Account of the Malignant Fever
Carlos Finlay
Diseases and epidemics of the 19th century
Juan Guiteras
Valentine Seaman
Walter Reed Medal
William C. Gorgas

References

Bibliography

External links
 

Yellow fever
United States national commissions
Military medical research organizations of the United States